The Siyokoy (Syokoy) are creatures in Philippine mythology which were members of Bantay Tubig (merfolk). They are usually illustrated as green-skinned humanoids with scales, webbed limbs, and fins.

Distinguishing characteristic 
Compared to Sirena, Sireno, and Kataw who have human features, Siyokoys are of animalic in physical form and structure. Some people describe Siyokoy as...

Intimidating aquatic animals such as eels, octopus, rays and squids usually swim along with Siyokoy.

References

External links
 Filipino Folklore Syokoy

Philippine legendary creatures
Visayan mythology
Piscine and amphibian humanoids